Events from the year 1612 in art.

Events
 (unknown)

Paintings

 Cornelis Engelsz – The St Adrian Civic Guard
 Artemisia Gentileschi - Judith Slaying Holofernes (first version (National Museum of Capodimonte, Naples); approximate date)
 Marcus Gheeraerts the Younger - Anne of Denmark in mourning (approximate date)
 Peter Paul Rubens
 The Four Philosophers (1611-12)
 The Massacre of the Innocents (first version; approximate date)
 Saint Peter as Pope (1611-12)
 Joachim Wtewael - The Wedding of Peleus and Thetis

Births
February 9 - Pier Francesco Mola, Italian painter of frescoes (died 1666)
April 12 - Simone Cantarini, Italian painter and etcher of the Bolognese School of painting (died 1648)
August 2 - Saskia van Uylenburgh, Dutch wife and model of Rembrandt (died 1642)
December 2 (baptized) - David Ryckaert III, Flemish painter, member of the Ryckaert family of artists (died 1661)
date unknown
Michel Anguier, French sculptor (died 1686)
Barent Avercamp, Dutch painter (died 1679)
Baldassare Bianchi, Italian painter (died 1679)
Abraham Bosschaert, member of the Bosschaert family of still life painters (died 1643)
Kun Can, Chinese painter from Hunan who spent most of his life in Nanjing (died 1674)
Francisco de Burgos Mantilla, Spanish painter (died 1672)
Francesco Francanzano, Italian painter who participated in the Masaniello rebellion (died 1657)
Frans Wouters, Flemish Baroque painter (died 1659)
Zhou Lianggong, Chinese bureaucrat, poet, essayist and art historian  (died 1672), patron of many important Chinese painters
probable
Juan Bautista Martínez del Mazo, Spanish Baroque portrait and landscape painter (died 1667)
Harmen Steenwijck, Dutch painter of still lifes, notably of fruit (died 1656)
Andries Both, Dutch genre painter (died 1642)

Deaths
March - Philip Galle, publisher of old master prints (born 1537)
May 31 - Willem Isaacsz Swanenburg, Dutch engraver (born 1580)
August 17 - Alexander Colyn, Flemish sculptor (born 1527/1529)
October 4 - Cesare Aretusi, Italian painter primarily of portraits (born 1580)
October 10 - Bernardino Poccetti, Italian Mannerist painter (born 1548)
date unknown
Federico Barocci, Italian Renaissance painter and printmaker (born 1526)
Giovanni Bizzelli, Italian painter (born 1556)
Francesco Cavazzoni, Italian painter and art historian (born 1559)
Pieter Claeissens the Younger, Flemish painter (date of birth unknown)
Nicolas Cordier, French sculptor, painter and printmaker (born 1567)
Dominicus Custos, Flemish printer and copperplate engraver (born 1560)
Aert Pietersz, Dutch painter (born 1550)
Giovanni Battista Trotti, Italian painter active mainly in his native city of Cremona (born 1555)

 
Years of the 17th century in art
1610s in art